Dandelion 'coffee' (also dandelion tea) is a tisane made from the root of the dandelion plant. The roasted dandelion root pieces and the beverage have some resemblance to coffee in appearance and taste, and it is thus commonly considered a coffee substitute. Dandelion root is used for both medicinal and culinary purposes and is thought to be a detoxifying herb.

History 
The usage of the dandelion plant dates back to the ancient Egyptians, Greeks and Romans. Additionally, for over a thousand years, Chinese traditional medicine has been known to incorporate the plant.

Susanna Moodie explained how to prepare dandelion 'coffee' in her memoir of living in Canada, Roughing it in the Bush (1852), where she mentions that she had heard of it from an article published in the 1830s in New York Albion by a certain Dr. Harrison.
Dandelion 'coffee' was later mentioned in a Harpers New Monthly Magazine story in 1886. In 1919, dandelion root was noted as a source of cheap 'coffee'. It has also been part of edible plant classes dating back at least to the 1970s.

Harvesting

Harvesting dandelion roots requires differentiating 'true' dandelions (Taraxacum spp.) from other yellow daisy-like flowers such as catsear and hawksbeard. True dandelions have a ground-level rosette of deep-toothed leaves and hollow straw-like stems. Large plants that are 3–4 years old, with taproots approximately 0.5 inch (13 mm) in diameter, are harvested for dandelion coffee. These taproots are similar in appearance to pale carrots.

Dandelion roots that are harvested in the spring have sweeter and less bitter notes, while fall-harvested roots are richer and more bitter.

Preparation
The dandelion plant must be two years old before removing the root. After harvesting, the dandelion roots are dried, chopped, and roasted. After harvesting, the dandelion roots are sliced lengthwise and placed to dry for two weeks in a warm area. When ready, the dried roots are oven-roasted and stored away. To prepare a cup, one will steep about 1 teaspoon of the root in hot water for around 10 minutes. People often enjoy their dandelion coffee with cream and sugar.

Health claims and uses
Although popular in alternative health circles, there is no empirical evidence that dandelion root or its extracts can treat any medical condition. In addition, very few high-quality clinical trials have been performed to investigate its effects.

Health risks associated with dandelion root are uncommon; however, directly consuming the plant by mouth could lead to stomach discomfort, heartburn, allergic reactions, or diarrhea.

Research
Dandelion root has been linked to a possible treatment for cancer.

A 2016 study result's suggests that colon cancer cell's metabolic activity can be reduced with doses of dandelion root extract. Research points towards a potential decrease in colon tumors with a scheduled and consistent dose of dandelion root extract. In a November 30, 2017 interview, Caroline Hamm, the oncologist running the study, shared her concerns regarding premature internet hype about these studies. She specifically expressed alarm over individuals contacting her who wanted to abandon standard care.

Chemistry
Unroasted Taraxacum officinale (among other dandelion species) root contains:

Sesquiterpene lactones
Taraxacin (a guaianolide)
Phenylpropanoid glycosides: dihydroconiferin, syringin, and dihydrosyringin
Taraxacoside(a cylated gamma-butyrolactone glycoside)
Lactupircin

Carotenoids
Lutein
Violaxanthin

Coumarins
Esculin
Scopoletin

Flavonoids
Apigenin-7-glucoside
Luteolin-7-glucoside
Isorhamnetin 3-glucoside
Luteolin-7-diglucoside
Quercetin-7-glucoside
Quercetin
Luteolin
Rutin
Chrysoeriol

Phenolic acids
Caffeic acid
Chlorogenic acid
Chicoric acid (dicaffeoyltartaric acid)
ρ-hydroxyphenylacetic acids

Polysaccharides
Glucans mannans
inulin (8)

Cyanogenic glycosides
Prunasin

Sesquiterpene lactones (of the germacranolide type)
11β, 13-dihydrolactucin
Ixerin D
Ainslioside taraxinic acid
β-glucopyranosyl
Taraxinic acid
Glucosyl ester
11-dihydrotaraxinic acid and 13-dihydrotaraxinic acid
l'-glucoside
Lactucopicrin
Lactucin
Cichorin

Eudesmanolides
Tetrahydroridentin-B
Taraxacolide-O-β-glucopyranoside
Prunasin
Dihydroconiferin
Syringin
Dihydrosyringin
Taraxasterol
ψ-taraxasterol
Homo-taraxasterol
Stigmatsterol

Triterpenes
Cycloartenol
α-amyrin
β-amyrin
Arnidiol
Faradiol
Lupeol
Taraxol
Taraxaserol and
3β-hydroxylup-18-ene-21-one

Sterols
Taraxasterol
ψ-taraxasterol
Homo-taraxasterol
β-sitosterol
Stigmatsterol
Campesterol

Other
Lettucenin A
Taraxalisin, a serine proteinase
Amino acids
Choline
Mucilage
Pectin

See also
 Chicory#History/Camp Coffee

References 

Coffee substitutes
Herbal tea